On The Slide, the 13th studio album by the American rock band The Figgs, was released on May 13, 2016 on Stomper, a year after their acclaimed “Other Planes Of Here.” It was recorded and mixed by Ducky Carlisle, Pete Donnelly, and Mike Gent at Ice Station Zebra, Soundcheck Republic, Moontower, and Westmont Station. Guests include longtime Figgs collaborators John Powhida and Ted Collins. On The Slide was rated one of the Top 10 Local Albums of 2016 by The Daily Gazette.

Track listing

References

2016 albums
The Figgs albums